Dereneu is a commune in Călărași District, Moldova. It is composed of three villages: Bularda, Dereneu and Duma.

References

Communes of Călărași District